Portugal participated in the Eurovision Song Contest 2003 with the song "Deixa-me sonhar (só mais uma vez)" written by Paulo Martins. The song was performed by Rita Guerra, who was internally selected by the Portuguese broadcaster Rádio e Televisão de Portugal (RTP) on 9 January 2003 to represent the nation at the 2003 contest in Riga, Latvia. RTP returned to the Eurovision Song Contest after a one-year absence following their withdrawal in 2002 as one of the bottom six countries in the 2001 contest. The national final Canção para Eurovisão 2003 was organised on 2 March 2003 in order to select the song that Rita Guerra would perform, where "Deixa-me sonhar (só mais uma vez)" emerged as the winning song after gaining 75% of the public televote.

Portugal competed in the Eurovision Song Contest which took place on 24 May 2003. Performing during the show in position 7, Portugal placed twenty-second out of the 26 participating countries, scoring 13 points.

Background 
Prior to the 2003 contest, Portugal had participated in the Eurovision Song Contest thirty-six times since its first entry in 1964. The nation's highest placing in the contest was sixth, which they achieved in 1996 with the song "O meu coração não tem cor" performed by Lúcia Moniz. Portugal's least successful result has been last place, which they have achieved on three occasions, most recently in 1997 with the song "Antes do adeus" performed by Célia Lawson. Portugal has also received nul points on two occasions; in 1964 and 1997. 

The Portuguese national broadcaster, Rádio e Televisão de Portugal (RTP), broadcasts the event within Portugal and organises the selection process for the nation's entry. RTP confirmed Portugal's participation in the 2003 Eurovision Song Contest on 29 November 2002. The broadcaster has traditionally selected the Portuguese entry for the Eurovision Song Contest via the music competition Festival da Canção, with an exception in 1988 when the Portuguese entry was internally selected. Despite the initial announcement that the selection of the 2003 Portuguese entry would involve the reality singing competition Operação Triunfo, the broadcaster internally selected the artist due to scheduling conflicts and organized a national final in order to select the song.

Before Eurovision

Artist selection 
The Portuguese entrant for the 2003 Eurovision Song Contest was internally selected by RTP. On 9 January 2003, the broadcaster announced that Rita Guerra had been internally selected to represent Portugal in Riga, while her song would be chosen through a national final. Rita Guerra previously attempted to represent Portugal at the Eurovision Song Contest in 1992, placing second in the national final with the song "Meu amor inventado em mim".

Canção para Eurovisão 2003 
Following the announcement that Rita Guerra would represent Portugal, composers were able to submit their songs for the competition between 9 January 2003 and 5 February 2003. A jury panel consisting of selected three songs from 500 submissions received, which were revealed on 18 February 2003. The national final consisted of two shows held during the first season of the reality singing competition Operação Triunfo on 23 February and 2 March 2003, both taking place at the Endemol TV Studios in Mem-Martins, hosted by Catarina Furtado and broadcast on RTP1 and RTP Internacional. The first show on 23 February was an introductory show where the three songs, all performed by Rita Guerra, were presented to the public who were able to vote for their favourite songs until the second show on 2 March, during which the winner, "Deixa-me sonhar (só mais uma vez)", was selected solely by the public televote.

At Eurovision
According to Eurovision rules, all nations with the exceptions of the bottom ten countries in the 2002 contest competed in the final on 24 May 2003. On 29 November 2002, a special allocation draw was held which determined the running order and Portugal was set to perform in position 7, following the entry from Bosnia and Herzegovina and before the entry from Croatia. Portugal finished in twenty-second place with 13 points.

In Portugal, the two shows were broadcast on RTP1 and RTP Internacional with commentary by Margarida Mercês de Melo. The Portuguese spokesperson, who announced the Portuguese votes during the final, was Helena Ramos.

Voting
Below is a breakdown of points awarded to Portugal and awarded by Portugal in the contest. The nation awarded its 12 points to Spain in the contest.

References

External links
Portuguese National Final 2003

2003
Countries in the Eurovision Song Contest 2003
Eurovision